The 2019–20 Oklahoma Sooners women's basketball team represented the University of Oklahoma in the 2019–20 NCAA Division I women's basketball season. The Sooners were led by Sherri Coale in her twenty-fourth season. The team played its home games at the Lloyd Noble Center in Norman, Oklahoma as a member of the Big 12 Conference.

They finished the season 12–18, 5–13 in Big 12 play to finish in ninth place. The Big 12 Tournament, NCAA women's basketball tournament and WNIT were all cancelled before they began due to the COVID-19 pandemic.

Previous season

The Sooners finished the season 8–22, 4–14 in Big 12 play to finish in a tie for eighth place. They lost in the first round of the Big 12 women's tournament to Texas Tech. They missed the postseason tournament for the first time since 1998 and their first losing season in 21 years.

Roster

Schedule

Source:

|-
!colspan=9 style=| Exhibition

|-
!colspan=9 style=| Non-conference regular season

|-
! colspan=9 style=| Big 12 Regular Season

|-
!colspan=9 style=| Big 12 Women's Tournament

Rankings

See also
 2019–20 Oklahoma Sooners men's basketball team

References

2017-18
2019–20 Big 12 Conference women's basketball season
2019 in sports in Oklahoma
2020 in sports in Oklahoma